Mirzā Mazhar Jān-i Jānān, also known by his laqab Shamsuddīn Habībullāh (1699–1781), was a renowned Hanafi Maturidi Naqshbandī Sufi poet of Delhi, distinguished as one of the "four pillars of Urdu poetry." He was also known to his contemporaries as the sunnītarāsh, "Sunnicizer", for his absolute, unflinching commitment to and imitation of the Sunnah.

He established the Naqshbandī suborder Mazhariyya Shamsiyya.

Birth and early life
The date of birth is variously given as 1111 or 1113 A.H, and it took place in Kālā Bāgh, Mālwa, according to one source, while according to another source he was born in Agra. Shaikh Muhammad Tahir Bakhshi notes his date of birth as 11th Ramadan 1111 AH. He was born into a noble family of Afghan parentage that served in the administration of the Mughals. His father Mirzā Jān was employed in the army of the mighty Mughal Emperor Aurangzeb. Following a custom according to which the Emperor had the right to name the sons of his officers, Aurangzeb is reported to have said:

"A son is the soul of his father. Since the name of his father is Mirzā Jān, the name of the son will be Jān-i Jānān."

His early religious instruction was entrusted to hājjī Afzal Siyālkōtī (hadith) and hāfiz Abd al-Rasūl Dihlawī (Qur'an). At the age of 18, he joined the Naqshbandī order under Nūr Muhammad Bada'ūni, who was closely connected to the teachings of Shaykh Ahmad Sirhindī, and completed his studies in four years. He was also initiated in the Qādirī, Chishtī and Suhrawardī orders.

In his prime, Mazhar was advised to write poetry in Urdu rather than Persian as the days of the latter language were said to be numbered in India. Besides authoring poetry and polemics, Mazhar also wrote a large number of letters relating to Sufi thought and practice.

Legacy and influence

Among his 'disciples' or Muridīn was the great Hanafī scholar, Qādī Thanāullāh Panipatī, who wrote a famous Tafsir of the Qur'an by the name Tafsir-i Mazharī, which he named after his teacher. Also in his spiritual lineage (silsila) came the great Hanafī jurist Imam Ibn 'Abidīn and the Qur'an exegete Allāma Alusī.

His Naqshbandī lineage came to be known as Mazhariyya Shamsiyya. Mazhar apparently authorized more disciples than any of his predecessors. He regularly corresponded with his deputies, and his letters form much of the basis of our knowledge about his life and ideas.

He was succeeded by his khalifa (deputy) Abdullah alias Shah Ghulam Ali Dahlavi, who is considered Mujaddid of the 13th Islamic century by most Naqshbandi followers today. His tariqah spread to whole India and Middle East.

Death
Mirzā Mazhar was shot and seriously injured on the 7th of Muharram, of the year 1195 AH/1780 CE. The author of Āb-i Ḥayāt writes:

"The cause of this murder was widely rumored in Delhi among high and low: that according to custom, on the seventh day [of Muḥarram], the standards were carried aloft [in procession]. Mirzā Mazhar sat by the side of the road in the upper veranda of his house, with some of his special disciples. Just as ordinary barbarous people do, his [Sunni] group and the [Shia] procession group may perhaps have hurled some insults and abuse, and some barbarous person was offended. Among them was one stony-hearted person named Faulād [=steel] Ḳhān, who was extremely barbarous. He did this evil deed. But Ḥakīm Qudratullāh Ḳhān 'Qāsim', in his anthology, says that in his poetry Mirzā Sahib used to compose a number of verses in praise of Hazrat ʿAlī, and some Sunni took this amiss and did this evil deed.

The author of Āb-i Ḥayāt, a determined Shi'a, has been suspected of indulging in partisan religious bias. Professor Frances Pritchett has noted that the latter account of the death of Mirzā Mazhar in Āb-i Ḥayāt is a deliberate distortion. Professor Friedmann, as well as Annemarie Schimmel and Itzchad Weismann, have all noted that Mirzā Mazhar was killed by a Shi'ite zealot.

Most of his Urdu biographers have also written that he was killed by a gunshot by a Shi'ite on 7th Muharram, and he died on 10th Muharram 1195 AH.

Spiritual Chain of Succession

Mirza Mazhar belonged to the Mujaddidi order of Sufism, which is the main branch of Naqshbandi Sufi tariqah. His spiritual lineage goes through Shaikh Ahmad Sirhindi, the Mujaddid of eleventh Hijri century.

Khulafa
In Maqamat Mazhari, his foremost Khalifa and successor Shah Ghulam Ali Dahlwai writes short biographies of many of his Khulafa (deputies). Among them were:

 Qadi Thanaullah Panipati, author of Tafsir Mazhari and other notable Islamic books, descendant of Usman the third caliph of Islam
 Mawlana FadalUllah, elder brother of Qadi Thanaullah Panipati
 Mawlana AhmadUllah, eldest son of Qadi Thanaullah Panipati, famous for his braveness and fighting skills
 Wife of Qadi Thanaullah Panipati
 Shah NaimUllah Bahraichi Naqshbandi  author of Mamoolaat-e- Mazhariya, Basharaat-e- Mazhariya (Hand written copy in British Museum India office London.
 Shah Abdul Ghani Mujadidi 
 Maulvi Kalim Faruqi, scholar of Hadith and founder of the Maulvi family in Sylhet

See also
Urdu poetry
List of Urdu language poets

References

External links
Maqamat Mazhari (Urdu translation): Biography of Mirza Mazhar

Urdu-language poets from India
Sufi poets
Indian male poets
Sunni Sufis
Naqshbandi order
Ziyarat
Dargahs in India
18th-century Muslim scholars of Islam
Indian Sufis
Indian people of Afghan descent
Poets from Delhi
Hanafis
Maturidis
1699 births
1781 deaths
17th-century Urdu-language writers
Urdu-language writers from British India
Urdu-language writers from Mughal India
18th-century Indian poets
18th-century male writers
Mughal Empire people